Tyler Nelson may refer to:
 Tyler Nelson (basketball)
 Tyler Nelson (editor), film and television

See also
 Nelson Tyler, engineer and inventor